Dereköy (literally "creekville") is a village in Bozyazı district of Mersin Province, Turkey. It is a mountain village in the Taurus Mountains. The population of Dereköy was  341 as of 2012. The population of the village is composed of Turkmens. Dereköy was once a part of İshaklar village situated to the south; but it  eventually issued from İhsaklar. Main economic activity is animal breeding and agriculture. But some residents also work in services either in Anamur or Bozyazı and spend only summers in Dereköy.

References

Villages in Bozyazı District